Michael Wright (born 25 March 1941) is an English former professional road bicycle racer from 1962 to 1976. He won stages in the Tour de France and the Vuelta a España stage races and represented Great Britain at several world championships.

Early life
Wright was born in Bishop's Stortford, Hertfordshire. His father died in World War II and his mother remarried to a Belgian soldier. The family emigrated to Belgium when Wright was only three. He grew up in Liège.

Wright's first sport was football. However, when his stepfather died leaving the family short of money, Wright turned to cycling as a more lucrative way of exploiting his athletic talent.

His first language was French and, although he represented Great Britain at the Tour de France and several World road race championships, his English was limited. During the winter of 1967-8 he took evening classes to brush up his English in preparation for riding with the British team. In 2006, he told Procycling magazine that his English is poor.

He told Procycling that he profited from his British nationality because he was never good enough to ride in a Belgian national team. Being British gave him rides in world championships and, in 1967 and 1968, in the Tour de France (held in those years for national teams). He rode with a small Union Jack sewn to the sleeves of his jerseys.

When he stopped racing, he worked as a salesman for the IJsboerke ice-cream company, which briefly had a professional team of its own.

Professional career
Wright was too big to ride well in the high mountains, but he was a fast finisher from a small group.

Tour de France
Wright rode the Tour de France eight times, finishing 24th in 1965 and winning three stages. Together with Barry Hoban, Wright provided Great Britain with its most consistent period of Tour stage wins during the late sixties and early seventies. He was a member of the British team in 1967 - the year that Tommy Simpson collapsed and died on Mont Ventoux.

Tour record:
1964: 56th
1965: 24th - 1st stage 20: Lyon > Auxerre
1967: did not finish - 1st stage 7: Metz > Strasbourg
1968: 28th  
1969: 71st  
1972: 55th  
1973: 57th - 1st stage 10: Nice > Aubagne
1974: 57th

Vuelta a España
Wright won 4 stages of the Vuelta a España: 2 in 1968 and 2 in 1969. In 1968 he was third in the points classification. In 1969 he came 5th on general classification, 2nd on the points classification and wore the leader's jersey for 2 days.

Stage wins:
1968: Zaragoza > Lleida and Barcelona > Salou
1969: Badajoz > Badajoz and Moyá > Barbastro

Major results

1961 - Amateur
21 wins
1962 - First professional year
1st Grand Prix du Brabant Wallon
1963
1st Hoegaarden
1964
1st Tour du Condroz
1st Grand Prix de Denain
1st Critéruim de Visé
1st Bruxelles-Nandrin
1st Stage 2 Tour du Nord
1965
1st Hoeilaart-Diest-Hoeilaart
1st Criterium of London
1st Stage 20 Tour de France 
5th Liège–Bastogne–Liège
1966
1st Bruxelles-Verviers
4th Henninger Turm
1967
1st Vaux Grand Prix
1st Grand Prix de Pamel
3rd Manx Trophy
1st Stage 7 Tour de France 
6th Omloop Het Volk
1968
1st Flèche Hesbignonne
1st Critérium d'Hasselt
1st Stage 1 Tour de Luxembourg
Vuelta a España 
1st Stages 2 & 4
5th Tour de l'Oise
1969
1st Tour du Condroz
1st Stage 1 Vuelta al País Vasco - G.P Eibar 
Tour du Nord
1st Stages 1 & 4 
5th Overall Vuelta a España 
1st Stages 1 & 13
1970
1st stage 3 Volta a Catalunya
1973
1st Stage 10 Tour de France
1974
1st Circuit du Port de Dunkerque
2nd Four Days of Dunkirk
1975
2nd Circuit de Wallonie
1976
1st Circuit de Niel

External links
Michael Wright's palmares at memoire-du-cyclisme.net

British riders at the Vuelta from veloarchive.com

Bibliography
Fotheringham, W. (2005), Roule Britannia: A History of Britons in the Tour de France, London: Yellow Jersey, 

1941 births
Living people
English male cyclists
British Tour de France stage winners
British Vuelta a España stage winners
People from Bishop's Stortford